The Cananea strike, also known as the Cananea riot, or the Cananea massacre, took place in the Mexican mining town of Cananea, Sonora, in June 1906. Although the workers were forced to return to their positions with no demand being met, the action was a key event in the general unrest that emerged during the final years of the regime of President Porfirio Díaz and that prefigured the Mexican Revolution of 1910. In the incident twenty-three people died, on both sides, twenty-two were injured, and more than fifty were arrested.

History of the Cananea Copper Company
The Cananea Copper Company was founded by American entrepreneur William Cornell Greene in 1896. Greene was receiving allowances from Porfirio Díaz's government. They enabled Greene to build the mine into one of the most essential mines in Mexico, and to also gain control over land and cattle, transportation networks, and lumber mills. This gave Greene infinite sovereignty over a large amount of Mexican land, as well as the laborers who worked in his various enterprises. These concessions, and the history of the company itself, epitomized Díaz's betrayal and unfaithfulness to Mexico's resources. Díaz was extremely corrupt and only wanted to benefit himself, his close supporters, and his foreign resources.

Location
In 1906 Cananea was a company town with a population totaling 23,000. Of these 21,000 were Mexican and the remainder American. Senior Cananea Consolidated Copper Company positions were held by non-Mexicans, who in 1906 were more commonly former frontier acquaintances of the U.S. proprietor William Greene rather than professional book-keepers and managers.  Order was kept by a private police force maintained by the company and labour relations were strained. The only source of foodstuffs and other commodities was a company store, which reportedly sold its goods at high prices.

Strike

By 1906, the Nogales-based Cananea Consolidated Copper Company had some 5,360 Mexican workers employed at its Cananea copper mines, earning three and a half pesos per day while the 2,200 American workers there were earning five pesos for the same job. Organised strike action against the company by the American employees had occurred in 1903, setting an unintended example for the Mexican workers.  Conditions in which the Mexican employees worked were deplorable. During the celebrations of Cinco de Mayo, the Mexican employees made public their complaints while the local authority applied martial law to avoid further conflicts.

On June 1, most of the Mexican miners went on strike. Led by Juan José Ríos, Manuel Macario Diéguez and Esteban Baca Calderón, their demands were the removal of one foreman named Luis, the pay of five pesos for eight hours' work, the employment quotas ensuring seventy-five percent of the jobs for Mexicans and twenty-five percent for foreigners, the deployment of responsible and respectful men to operate the cages and that all Mexican workers to be entitled to promotions, in accordance with their skills.

The company executives rejected all of the petitions and the workers decided to march and gather people from other towns in the municipality. The population supported the workers and the crowd numbered more than 3,000 people. While they were marching in front of the wood shop of the company, the American employees in charge of that department, the Metcalf brothers, turned hoses on them and then fired shots, killing three people. The angry mob set the building on fire, burning four American occupants to death. When the crowd approached the government building of the municipal president they were received by a 275-man American posse led by an Arizona Ranger acting against the Governor's orders. Other workers were killed while the strike leaders were sent to prison. Contemporary news reports in The New York Times on June 3, 1906 reported that on June 1, strikers destroyed a lumber mill and killed two brothers who were defending the mine. Eleven casualties were reported among the Mexican "rioters".

About half of the company police avoided involvement in the disturbance. Responding to a telegraphed plea from Colonel William Cornell Greene of the Greene Consolidated Copper Company, a posse of 275 volunteers from Bisbee, Douglas and Naco, Arizona, commanded by Captain Thomas H. Rynning of the Arizona Rangers, entered Mexico against the orders of Joseph Henry Kibbey, Governor of Arizona Territory. At the order of Rafael Izabal Governor of Sonora, forty Rurales (Mexican mounted police) were despatched from Hermosillo to reinforce a detachment under Colonel Emilio Kosterlitsky already present. Mexican Federal troops were also sent to Cananea.  Four troops of the U.S. 5th Cavalry en route from Fort Huachuca were held at Naco, Arizona, on the border on the orders of President William Howard Taft.

A tense confrontation between striking miners and approximately 200 Americans ensued. Many participants were armed and shots were exchanged. At Colonel Kosterlitsky's orders the American interventionists left the town by rail, to return across the border. Mexican Rurales and Federal soldiers then disarmed the strikers and made arrests.

Aftermath
According to Colonel Green the "trouble was incited by a Socialistic organization that has been formed by malcontents opposed to the Díaz government." Shortly before the strike, a political party called the Partido Liberal Mexicano (PLM) had been established with wide support. The PLM quickly became involved in aggressively pressing for industrial and rural reform. At both the French-controlled Rio Blanco textile factory and the American-owned Cananea Copper Company mine, PLM literature was subsequently to be found distributed through the workers' settlements.

The presumed strike leaders were arrested by the Mexican authorities and sentenced to jail terms of up to fifteen years. They were released in May 1911, in the course of the Mexican Revolution.

Although the government forces present had behaved with relative restraint, the entry of armed foreigners into national territory caused Mexican outrage against the Diaz administration. Diaz had sent orders to Governor Izabal not to accept any American involvement in restoring order in Cananea but the telegram had arrived after the trainload of Arizona Rangers and civilian supporters had crossed the border.

The incident became linked with the Río Blanco strike of January 1907 as two symbols of the Porfirio Díaz administration's corruption, subservience to foreign interests and civil repression.  They became "household words for hundreds of thousands of Mexicans". The local impact was however more limited. A new company manager, Dr Louis D. Ricketts, with extensive mining experience was
appointed and introduced enlightened wage and employment practices. By 1912 the foreign element in the company workforce had been reduced to 13% of the total. The personal ownership and management style of William Greene ceased when he was bought out by an ownership group which focussed on modernisation and efficiency.

Modern
A corrido titled "Cananea jail" written in 1917 commemorates the incident.

The Cananea municipal jail, built in 1903 and located in downtown Cananea, is currently a museum Workers' Struggle Museum and also houses exhibitions of photographs and instruments used in mining.

The mine in Cananea currently continues to be worked for copper. After the original 1906 strike the Cananea mine has remained the scene of frequent labor disputes, with the most recent incident being a miners strike of 2007–2008.

References.

1906 labor disputes and strikes
1906 in Mexico
1906 in Arizona Territory
Mass murder in 1906
1906 murders in Mexico
1906 murders in the United States
June 1906 events
Massacres in Mexico
Labour disputes in Mexico
Porfiriato
Miners' labor disputes
American frontier
History of Arizona
Arizona Rangers